The List of Lithuanian basketball league champions is composed of the top-tier level national domestic men's basketball league champions of each year, in the country of Lithuania. Including from before, during, and after the era of the former Soviet republic of the Lithuania SSR.

Lithuanian League champions (1924–1939)

1924 LFLS Kaunas
1925 Kovas Kaunas       
1926 LFLS Kaunas         
1927 LFLS Kaunas          
1928 LFLS Kaunas  
1929 not contested   
1930 not contested   
1931 not contested   
1932 not contested          
1933 LGSF Kaunas         
1934 LGSF Kaunas         
1935 LFLS Kaunas         
1936 LFLS Kaunas        
1937 CJSO Kaunas       
1938 CJSO Kaunas       
1939 not contested

Lithuanian SSR League champions (1940–1991)

1940 CJSO Kaunas      
1941 not contested    
1942 Perkūnas Kaunas        
1943 not contested
1944 not contested          
1945 ASK Kaunas      
1946 Žalgiris Kaunas     
1947 KKI Kaunas             
1948 KKI Kaunas             
1949 KKI Kaunas            
1950 Žalgiris Kaunas       
1951 KKI Kaunas            
1952 Žalgiris Kaunas       
1953 Žalgiris Kaunas      
1954 Žalgiris Kaunas    
1955 Žalgiris Kaunas    
1956 Kaunas         
1957 Žalgiris Kaunas
1958 Žalgiris Kaunas
1959 KPI Kaunas          
1960 LŽŪA Kaunas         
1961 LŽŪA Kaunas         
1962 Maistas Klaipėda
1963 Kaunas                
1964 Drobė Kaunas
1965 Politechnika Kaunas    
1966 Politechnika Kaunas
1967 Kaunas                
1968 Atletas Kaunas        
1969 Drobė Kaunas    
1970 Drobė Kaunas     
1971 Banga Kaunas         
1972 Statyba Vilnius
1973 Statyba Vilnius
1974 Kaunas       
1975 Statyba Vilnius
1976 Drobė Kaunas
1977 Statyba Vilnius
1978 Drobė Kaunas
1979 Drobė Kaunas
1980 Drobė Kaunas
1981 Statyba Vilnius
1982 Atletas Kaunas
1983 Atletas Kaunas
1984 Statyba Vilnius
1985 Lietkabelis Panevėžys
1986 Drobė Kaunas
1987 Drobė Kaunas
1988 Lietkabelis Panevėžys
1989 Atletas Kaunas
1990 Atletas Kaunas
1991 Žalgiris Kaunas

Lithuanian League champions (1992–1993)

1992 Žalgiris Kaunas 
1993 Žalgiris Kaunas

Lithuanian LKL League champions (1994–present)
The champions of the Lithuanian Basketball League LKL Finals:

1994 Žalgiris Kaunas 
1995 Žalgiris Kaunas 
1996 Žalgiris Kaunas
1997 Žalgiris Kaunas
1998 Žalgiris Kaunas
1999 Žalgiris Kaunas
2000 Lietuvos rytas Vilnius
2001 Žalgiris Kaunas
2002 Lietuvos rytas Vilnius	
2003 Žalgiris Kaunas
2004 Žalgiris Kaunas
2005 Žalgiris Kaunas
2006 Lietuvos rytas Vilnius
2007 Žalgiris Kaunas
2008 Žalgiris Kaunas
2009 Lietuvos rytas Vilnius
2010 Lietuvos rytas Vilnius
2011 Žalgiris Kaunas
2012 Žalgiris Kaunas
2013 Žalgiris Kaunas
2014 Žalgiris Kaunas
2015 Žalgiris Kaunas
2016 Žalgiris Kaunas
2017 Žalgiris Kaunas
2018 Žalgiris Kaunas
2019 Žalgiris Kaunas
2020 Žalgiris Kaunas
2021 Žalgiris Kaunas
2022  Rytas Vilnius

Titles by club

Lithuanian clubs in USSR League

See also
Lithuanian Basketball League
Lithuanian League Finals
Lithuanian King Mindaugas Cup
Lithuanian LKF Cup
Lithuanian Basketball League awards
LKL All-Star Day
Basketball in Lithuania

External links
Official LKL website
Lithuanian league at Eurobasket.com

Basketball in Lithuania
Lietuvos krepšinio lyga